The cast of the television series MythBusters perform experiments to verify or debunk urban legends, old wives' tales, and the like. This is a list of the myths tested on the show as well as the results of the experiments (the myth is Busted, Plausible, or Confirmed). On March 16, 2011, Discovery Channel announced that the 2011 season would commence airing on April 6, 2011.

Episode overview

Episode 160 – "Mission Impossible Mask"
 Original air date: April 6, 2011

Mission Impossible Face Off

Firearms Force

Episode 161 – "Blue Ice"
 Original air date: April 13, 2011

Bourne Magazine

Blue Ice

Episode 162 – "Running on Water"
 Original air date: April 20, 2011

Running on Water

What Is Bombproof?
The Build Team investigated the ability of everyday objects to reduce the likelihood of injury or death from an explosion.

For each object tested, they placed it at 10 and 20 feet, with rupture disks and a foam-cutout figure (to gauge shrapnel injuries) protected by it. They evaluated the question of surviving the shock wave by taking cover behind...

Episode 163 – "Bubble Trouble"
 Original air date: April 27, 2011

Bubble Trouble

Dynamite Axe

Episode 164 – "Torpedo Tastic"
 Original air date: May 4, 2011

Torpedo-Tastic

Exploding Wine

Episode 165 – "Blow Your Own Sail"
 Original air date: May 11, 2011

Sounds Bogus
Adam and Jamie compared movie sound effects to their real-world counterparts by recording samples of both. They looked into the realistic nature of...

Blow Your Own Sail

Episode 166 – "Spy Car 2"
 Original air date: May 18, 2011

Spy Car: The Revenge
A twist on "Spy Car Escape", with the focus on offensive rather than defensive methods to disable an enemy car. Adam and Jamie tested the use of...

Spinning Ice Bullets

Episode 167 – "Dodge a Bullet"
 Original air date: June 1, 2011

Dodge a Bullet

Water = Pavement

Episode 168 – "Fixing a Flat"
 Original air date: June 8, 2011

Fixin’ a Flat
Adam and Jamie tested three impromptu remedies for a flat tire in the wilderness, without a spare being available. At a 2-mile off-road hazard course, they set up a typical highway vehicle and cut into one tire. They tried to drive using...

Next they investigated ways to remedy a flat tire in an urban setting, setting up a road obstacle course. They tested...

Flaming Reel

Episode SP15 – "Planes, Trains, and Automobiles"
 Original air date: June 15, 2011

A countdown of the cast's 12 favorite myths involving forms of transportation.

Episode 169 – "Let There Be Light"
 Original air date: June 22, 2011

Let There Be Light

Bumper Cars

Episode 170 – "Paper Armor"
 Original air date: June 29, 2011

Depth Charge Disaster

Paper Armor

Episode 171 – "Bikes and Bazookas"
 Original air date: September 28, 2011
Starting this episode, the theme music is "rearranged and performed" by The Dandy Warhols.

Bike vs. Car

Red Bazooka

Episode 172 – "Newton's Crane Cradle"
 Original air date: October 5, 2011

Wrecking Ball Baloney

Bird Balance

Episode 173 – "Walk a Straight Line"
 Original air date: October 12, 2011

Walking Straight

Binary Fender Bender

Episode 174 – "Duct Tape Plane"
 Original air date: October 19, 2011

Excavator Exuberance
Adam and Jamie investigated three viral videos involving excavators. They tested the machine's ability to...

Duct Tape Plane

Episode 175 – "Flying Guillotine"
 Original air date: October 26, 2011

C4 Cook-Off

The Flying Guillotine

Episode 176 – "Drain Disaster"
 Original air date: November 2, 2011

Drain Disaster

Bedlam-Proof Bedliner
The Build Team tested viewers’ claims concerning the toughness of spray-on truck bedliner resin. They investigated its ability to withstand...

Episode SP16 – "Location, Location, Location"
 Original air date: November 9, 2011

A countdown of the cast's 12 favourite locations for testing myths, with an emphasis on one myth that was tested at the location.

Episode SP17 – "Wet and Wild"
 Original air date: November 16, 2011

A countdown of the cast's 12 favorite myths involving water.

Episode 177 – "Wheel of Mythfortune"
 Original air date: November 23, 2011
Adam, Jamie, and the Build Team test four myths chosen at random from viewer submissions.

Pick a Door

Adam and Jamie tested the myths that when people were presented with the Monty Hall problem, they would...

Grenade Shrapnel

Firearm Fashion
Adam and Jamie examined the effectiveness of handgun firing stances often used in movies to find out if they allow a handgun user to shoot faster and more accurately than the standard two-handed stance. The techniques they tested were...

There was one more technique tested in the 2012 season that proved more effective than the control.

Flaming Tire

Episode 178 – "Toilet Bomb"
 Original air date: November 30, 2011

Toilet Bomb

Flock Formation

References

General references

External links

 MythBusters Official site
 

2011
2011 American television seasons